Lake Henry is a lake in Le Sueur County, in the U.S. state of Minnesota.

Lake Henry was named for a local settler.

See also
List of lakes in Minnesota

References

Lakes of Minnesota
Lakes of Le Sueur County, Minnesota